Bishop Tikhon (secular name Nikolay Vladimirovich Stepanov, Николай Владимирович Степанов; 2 March 1963, Kostroma – 20 October 2010, Arkhangelsk, Russia) was the Russian Orthodox bishop of Arkhangelsk and Kholmogory.

Notes

1963 births
2010 deaths
People from Kostroma
Bishops of the Russian Orthodox Church